Oren Hall "Buddy" Harden, Jr. (born November 3, 1940) is an American politician from Cordele, Georgia. He previously served as a member of the Georgia House of Representatives from the 148th District, serving from 2008 until Jan. 14, 2019. He is a member of the Republican Party.

References

Living people
Republican Party members of the Georgia House of Representatives
1940 births
Place of birth missing (living people)
21st-century American politicians